American rock band Staind has released seven studio albums, three live albums, one compilations, two video albums, 25 singles, and 18 music videos.

Albums

Studio albums

Live albums

Compilation albums

Video albums

Singles

Promotional singles

Other appearances

Music videos

Notes

References

Rock music group discographies
Discographies of American artists